St Clement's Church, Horsley is a Grade I listed parish church in the Church of England in Horsley, Derbyshire.

History

The church dates from the 14th century. It was restored between 1858 and 1860 by the contractor Kerry and Allen of Smalley. It re-opened on 11 September 1860. A carved oak reredos was installed in 1928 and choir stalls in similar style were added in 1935.

Parish status
The church is in a joint parish with 
St Mary the Virgin's Church, Denby
Village Hall, Kilburn

Organ

The pipe organ dates from 1895 and was built by Nicholson and Lord. A specification of the organ can be found on the National Pipe Organ Register.

See also
Grade I listed churches in Derbyshire
Grade I listed buildings in Derbyshire
Listed buildings in Horsley, Derbyshire, and Horsley Woodhouse

References

Church of England church buildings in Derbyshire
Grade I listed churches in Derbyshire